Robiul Islam (born: 20 October 1986) is an international cricketer from Bangladesh. A right-handed batsman and bowler, he is sometimes referred to on scoresheets by his nickname Shiblu. He made his international debut for Bangladesh in May 2010.

International appearance
He made his first Test appearance in May 2010 during Bangladesh's tour of England. Robiul was not able to take a wicket in the match, which was won by England, on the other hand a run out came from his bowling and he was not selected for the next Test.

Against Zimbabwe
When Bangladesh played a one-off Test against Zimbabwe in July 2011 Robiul was included in the squad. Zimbabwe were returning from a six-year exile from Tests, although Bangladesh had not played in the format in over 14 months. Though they were expected to win, Bangladesh lost the Test. Robiul opened the bowling with Shafiul Islam, claiming three wickets in the match while conceding 154 runs. His first wicket was that of batsman Hamilton Masakadza, caught by Imrul Kayes. The West Indies toured in October and Robiul was dropped from the squad for the two Tests as the coach, Stuart Law, expected to play just two seam bowlers and already had three options in Nazmul Hossain, Rubel Hossain, and Shahadat Hossain.

Success in Test
Robiul remained around the fringes of the Test team, but it was not until March 2013 during Bangladesh's tour to Sri Lanka that he returned to the Test side, when a haul of 29 wickets from seven first-class matches in Bangladesh's domestic tournament caught the attention of the selectors. In the second match of the series Robiul played his first Test in 16 months.

The following month, Bangladesh toured Zimbabwe where they played two Tests. Robiul was included in the squad and finished with 15 wickets, costing 19.53 runs each. This was the most wickets taken by a Bangladesh seam bowler in a Test series, bettering the 12 Shahadat Hossain managed against South Africa in 2008. Including spin bowlers, only Mohammad Rafique and Enamul Haque Jr have bettered Robiul's tally of 15 wickets in a series, and Rafique took three matches to beat that figure.

References

External links

Bangladeshi cricketers
Bangladesh Test cricketers
Bangladesh One Day International cricketers
Bangladesh Twenty20 International cricketers
Khulna Division cricketers
Sylhet Division cricketers
Living people
1986 births
People from Satkhira District
Kala Bagan Krira Chakra cricketers
Victoria Sporting Club cricketers
Prime Bank Cricket Club cricketers
Bangladesh South Zone cricketers
Barisal Division cricketers